Jerome Kenneth Percus (born 21 June 1926 in New York City; died 7 March 2021) was a physicist and mathematician known for important contributions to statistical physics, chemical physics, and applied mathematics.

In 1958, he published with George J. Yevick a groundbreaking study on the statistical mechanics of classical liquids. They formulated an integral equation (Percus-Yevick equation) that is the foundation for several approximation methods for computing the pair correlation function, and thereby allow the derivation of thermodynamic properties from first principles.

Works 

Percus published several books:
 Combinatorial Methods, Applied Mathematical Sciences 4, Springer 1971
 Mathematics of genome analysis, Cambridge UP 2002
 Mathematical models in developmental biology, Courant Lectures in Mathematics 26, Courant Institute of Mathematical Sciences 2015 with Stephen Childress

References

External links 
 
 Homepage an der New York University
 
 Lebensdaten, Publikationen und Akademischer Stammbaum von Jerome K. Percus bei academictree.org, retrieved 22 April 2018.
 
 

1926 births
2021 deaths
American physicists
American mathematicians
People from New York City